The 2000–01 Georgian Cup (also known as the David Kipiani Cup) was the fifty-seventh season overall and eleventh since independence of the Georgian annual football tournament.

Round of 16 
The first legs were played on 7 November and the second legs were played on 12 November 2000.

|}

Quarterfinals 
The matches were played on 6 December (first legs) and 10 December 2000 (second legs).

|}

Semifinals 
The matches were played on 1 May (first legs) and 15 May 2001 (second legs).

|}

Final

See also 
 2000–01 Umaglesi Liga

References

External links 
 The Rec.Sport.Soccer Statistics Foundation.
 es.geofootball.com 

Georgian Cup seasons
Cup
Georgian Cup, 2000-01